Holy Trinity College (Irish: Coláiste na Tríonóide Naofa) is an 11–18 mixed, Roman Catholic secondary school and sixth form in Cookstown, County Tyrone, Northern Ireland.

History 
The school opened in September 1965. It was originally called St Patricks Boys Sec Intermediate School  and it was an all boys school. It also opened as a girls school in the adjacent building called Our Lady's Girls Secondary School.
Later, the schools became St Patrick's High School and Our Lady's High School.

Academics 

The school offers instruction at both GCSE and A-level. In 2018, 55.1% of its entrants achieved five or more GCSEs at grades A* to C, including the core subjects English and Maths. Also in 2018, 52.5% of its entrants to the A-level exam achieved A*-C grades.

References

External links 
 

Cookstown
Catholic secondary schools in Northern Ireland
Secondary schools in County Tyrone
Educational institutions established in 1961
1961 establishments in Northern Ireland